The 2014 Big West Conference women's basketball tournament will take place March 11–15, 2014. The first two rounds will take place at Walter Pyramid while the semifinals and championship will be at the Honda Center in Anaheim, California. The winner of the tournament will receive the conference's automatic bid to the 2014 NCAA Women's Division I Basketball Tournament.

Format
The top eight teams will qualify for the 2014 Big West tournament. Seeds 1 & 2 receive a double-bye while seeds 3 and 4 receive a single bye. The first round features 5 vs. 8 and 6 vs. 7. The lowest remaining seed moves on to play seed 3 in the quarterfinals while the other winner moves on to play seed 4 in the quarterfinals. The lowest remaining seed from the quarterfinals moves on to play seed 1 in the semifinals while the other remaining seed plays seed 2 in the semifinals.

Bracket

See also 
Big West Conference women's basketball tournament

References

External links
Big West Women's Basketball Tournament website

Big West Conference women's basketball
2013–14 in American women's college basketball